Shane Hugh Maryon Gough, 5th Viscount Gough (born 26 August 1941) is a peer of the United Kingdom. He was educated at Winchester College and Sandhurst. Son of Hugh William Gough, 4th Viscount Gough, MC, and Margaretta Elizabeth Maryon-Wilson. Lord Gough resides at the family seat, Keppoch House, near Dingwall, Scotland, but also has a London residence. His current employment is in London. He is unmarried, and there is currently no heir to the peerage or baronetcy.

Career
Lord Gough was educated at Abberley Hall School and Winchester College. He served as an officer in the Irish Guards (Household Division, British Army), following in family tradition. Although he followed his father into the Guards, his most famous military forebear is undoubtedly Field Marshal Hugh Gough, 1st Viscount Gough. After leaving military service he worked as a stockbroker.

Freemasonry
He is actively involved in English Freemasonry, having been initiated in the Prince of Wales's Lodge No 259 (London) in 1966 and installed as Master of the Lodge of Assistance No 2773 (London) in 1972.  He has subsequently been Master of Lodge of Assistance for two further terms. He served as Senior Grand Warden of the United Grand Lodge of England in 1984–1985. He was a Grand Steward in both 1974 and 1991, and in 2007 was installed as Master of the Grand Stewards' Lodge. He is also connected with Freemasonry in both Ireland and Scotland.

Order of Saint Lazarus (statuted 1910)
Lord Gough is Prior of the Grand Bailiwick of Scotland in the Order of Saint Lazarus (statuted 1910). The order aims to relieve the suffering of the sick and disadvantaged, with a particular emphasis on charitable support for those working for the relief and cure of leprosy.

Arms

References

External links

1941 births
Living people
Irish Guards officers
People educated at Winchester College
Graduates of the Royal Military Academy Sandhurst
British stockbrokers
5
Fellows of the Royal Geographical Society
Recipients of the Order of Saint Lazarus (statuted 1910)
Freemasons of the United Grand Lodge of England
Gough